Oskar Karl Maria Zoth (28 August 1864, Padua – 30 November 1933, Graz) was an Austrian physiologist.

In 1888 he received his medical doctorate from the University of Graz, where in 1896 he qualified as a lecturer for physiology. In 1898 he became an associate professor, and three years later, was a named a full professor at the University of Innsbruck. In 1904 he returned as a professor to the University of Graz. In 1900 he was a recipient of the Lieben Prize.

In an 1894 experiment he injected himself with a liquid extraction of bulls' testicles, then tested his muscle strength with a "Mosso ergograph". In regards to this testing, he stated "the training of athletes offers an opportunity for further research in this area and for a practical assessment of our experimental results".

Selected writings 
 Die Wirkungen der Augenmuskeln und die Erscheinungen bei Lähmungen derselben, 1897 – The effects of eye muscles and symptoms for paralysis.
 Pathologische Anatomie des Sehnerveneintrittes (with Anton Elschnig), 1900 – Pathological anatomy of optic nerve occurrences. 
 Über die natur der mischfarben auf grund der undulationshypothese, 1914 – Concerning the nature of mixing colors on the basis of the undulation hypothesis.
 Farbenbezeichnungen und -benennungen, 1925 – Color designation.
 Ergographie und ergometrie, 1936 – Ergography and ergometry.

References

1864 births
1933 deaths
University of Graz alumni
Academic staff of the University of Graz
Academic staff of the University of Innsbruck
Physicians from Padua
Austrian physiologists